←Paul Goubé (1912 in Paris – 30 March 1979, in Paris) was a 20th-century French dancer, choreographer, ballet master and teacher.

Biography 
A pupil of the Ballet de l'Opéra de Paris, he was hired by the troupe and became premier danseur in 1933. Very expressive, he was the interpreter of Serge Lifar in several ballets, joined the Nouveau Ballet de Monte-Carlo in 1942, then the ballet of the Opéra-Comique.

He choreographed several works for the Grand Ballet du Marquis de Cuevas and founded in Nice in 1955, the Ballets de la Méditerranée. In 1959, he was the ephemeral ballet master of the Théâtre de la Monnaie in Brussels, excluded from the institution following the arrival of Maurice Béjart.

In 1969, he founded his Paris dance school, established Salle Pleyel with his wife Yvonne Alexander. The school was revived in 1995 by their daughter Jennifer, under the name "Goubé European Dance Center".

Principal creations
1952: Le Lien
1953: Ad Alta
1954: Duo
1958: Le Feu aux Poudres
1959: Ad Alta (revived at the Théâtre de la Monnaie)

External links 
EUROPEAN DANCE CENTER PARIS, Goublé on  Goublé.com

1912 births
1979 deaths
Artists from Paris
French male ballet dancers
French choreographers
French ballet masters
Ballet teachers
20th-century ballet dancers